Bogdan Alexandru Dolha (born 4 October 1984) is a Romanian former football midfielder. In his career Dolha played mainly for teams from Cluj County such as: Universitatea Cluj, Arieşul Turda, Unirea Jucu, Sănătatea Cluj or Minerul Iara.

Club career
Dolha started his football career at Universitatea Cluj youth team. His first trainer was Mircea Cojocariu. In 2002, he won the national junior title.  The debut for the senior team was made in the 2002–2003 season. In 2004 Bogdan Dolha was loaned to the Liga III team Minerul Iara which was at that time Universitatea Cluj's satellite. One year later he was loaned again to a third league team, Avântul Reghin. In 2005 Dolha turned back to Universitatea Cluj and helped the team finish third in Liga II. In 2007, he promoted with Universitatea Cluj in Liga I.

External links
 
 

1984 births
Living people
Sportspeople from Cluj-Napoca
Romanian footballers
Association football midfielders
Liga I players
Liga II players
FC Universitatea Cluj players
ACS Sticla Arieșul Turda players